Peridaedala speculata is a species of moth of the family Tortricidae first described by Józef Razowski in 2013. It is found on Seram Island in Indonesia. The habitat consists of upper montane forests.

The wingspan is about 17 mm. The forewings are green with white costal strigulae (fine streaks) in the posterior half of the wing with blackish divisions. The markings are also blackish. The hindwings are greyish.

Etymology
The specific name refers to the similarity to its congeners and is derived from Latin speculum (meaning a similarity).

References

Moths described in 2013
Eucosmini